Founded in 1999, Stage First Cincinnati was a professional theatre company in Cincinnati, Ohio, United States dedicated to showcasing classical works of theatre and adaptations of classics in history and literature.  It became defunct in 2001.  Nicholas Korn served as the Executive Director.

Theatre companies in Cincinnati